The Delo and Daly Show was an Australian variety television series which aired from 1963 to 1964, and was produced by HSV-7. It was hosted by American comedy duo Ken Delo and Jonathan Daly, who had previously appeared as guests on In Melbourne Tonight. The guests on their series included a mix of Australian and American performers.

Jonathan Daly had previously been host on Daly at Night.

References

External links
The Start of Something Big - 2015 Interview with Jonathan Daly, with extensive discussion of The Delo and Daly Show

Australian variety television shows
1963 Australian television series debuts
1964 Australian television series endings
Black-and-white Australian television shows
English-language television shows
Seven Network original programming
Australian comedy television series